Cleopatra Feelin' Jazzy is a jazz album recorded in 1963 by Paul Gonsalves.

Track listing
"Caesar and Cleopatra Theme"
"Antony and Cleopatra Theme"
"Bluz for Liz"
"Cleo's Blues"
"Action in Alexandria"
"Cleo's Asp"
"Cleopatra's Lament"
"Second Chance" (Previously unreleased single)

Personnel
Paul Gonsalves - Tenor Saxophone 
Hank Jones - Piano 
Dick Hyman - Organ 
Kenny Burrell - Guitar 
George Duvivier - Bass
Roy Haynes - drums 
Manny Albam - percussion

References 

1963 albums
Paul Gonsalves albums
Impulse! Records albums
Albums recorded at Van Gelder Studio
Albums produced by Bob Thiele